Luc Henri Hervé Guy Gardye de la Chapelle (16 July 1868 – 27 August 1923) was a French tennis player. He competed in the men's doubles event at the 1900 Summer Olympics winning a bronze medal.

References

External links
 

1868 births
1923 deaths
French male tennis players
Olympic tennis players of France
Olympic bronze medalists for France
Olympic medalists in tennis
Medalists at the 1900 Summer Olympics
Tennis players at the 1900 Summer Olympics
Sportspeople from Cher (department)
Place of death missing